Ahmadabad-e Sahlavar (also Romanized as Aḩmadābād-e Sahlāvar; also known as Aḩmadābād) is a village in Nakhlestan Rural District, in the Central District of Kahnuj County, Kerman Province, Iran. At the 2006 census, its population was 436, in 104 families.

References 

Populated places in Kahnuj County